Daydalı is a village in the Emirdağ District, Afyonkarahisar Province, Turkey. Its population is 115 (2021). Daydali is situated 88 km from the province capital Afyonkarahisar.

Population 
Daydali had 153 residents in 2012. This number increases in the summer, when workers return from the big city's. In the winter this number decreases due to cold and insufficient facilities.

Infrastructure and facilities 
Primary education is available in the village. It has a working drinking water network and a sewage network. There is a small health clinic, complicated healthcare is only available in larger cities like Emirdağ. The town has some asphalt roads and since 2014 there is WiFi available in the townhall.

References

Villages in Emirdağ District